Katariina "Kati" Ahonen (born 7 November 1966) is a Finnish retired ice hockey goaltender. A ten-season member of the Finnish national ice hockey team, she won bronze medals at the IIHF Women's World Championships in 1992 and 1994, and participated in five IIHF European Women Championships, winning gold at the tournaments in 1989, 1991, 1993, and 1995, and bronze at the 1996 tournament.

At age 15, Ahonen debuted with the Tampereen Ilves Naiset in the inaugural season (1982–83) of the Naisten SM-sarja, the first national women’s ice hockey league in Finland. She went on to play a nineteen-season career in the league with the Tampereen Ilves Naiset, the Keravan Shakers, the Kiekko-Espoo Naiset (also under the name Espoo Blues Naiset), and the Itä-Helsingin Kiekko Naiset (IHK). During her playing career, Ahonen won the Finnish Championship eight times: four times with the Tampereen Ilves, in 1985, 1986, 1987, 1988; three times with the Keravan Shakers, in 1994, 1995, and 1996; and with the Espoo Blues in 1999.

References

External links 
 

Living people
Ice hockey people from Helsinki
Finnish women's ice hockey goaltenders
Ilves Naiset players
Keravan Shakers players
Espoo Blues Naiset players
Kiekko-Espoo Naiset players
IHK Naiset players
1966 births